The 2017–18 La Salle Explorers basketball team represented La Salle University during the 2017–18 NCAA Division I men's basketball season. The Explorers, led by 14th-year head coach John Giannini, played their home games at Tom Gola Arena in Philadelphia, Pennsylvania as members of the Atlantic 10 Conference. They finished the season 13–19, 7–11 in A-10 play to finish in a three-way tie for 10th place. As the No. 12 seed in the A-10 tournament, they lost in the first round to Massachusetts.

On March 23, 2018, head coach John Giannini and the school mutually agreed to part ways after 14 seasons. Giannini left with a 212–226 record at La Salle. On April 8, the school hired Villanova assistant Ashley Howard as head coach.

Previous season 
The Explorers finished the 2016–17 season 15–15, 9–9 in A-10 play to finish in a tie for seventh place. As the No. 8 seed in the A-10 tournament, they lost to Davidson in the first round.

Offseason

Departures

Incoming transfers

2017 recruiting class

2018 recruiting class

Preseason 
In a poll of the league’s head coaches and select media members at the conference's media day, the Hawks were picked to finish in ninth place in the A-10. Senior forward B.J. Johnson was named to the conference's preseason second team.

Roster

Schedule and results

|-
!colspan=9 style=| Exhibition

|-
!colspan=9 style=| Non-conference regular season

|-
!colspan=9 style=|Atlantic 10 regular season

|-
!colspan=9 style=| Atlantic 10 tournament

Source

References

La Salle Explorers men's basketball seasons
La Salle
La Salle
La Salle